Oil Can Henry's was an oil-change shop based in Tualatin, Oregon, United States. Prior to being bought by Ashland Inc. in 2015, the company operated as a franchisor, and had locations in Oregon, Washington, Idaho, California, Arizona, Colorado and Minnesota. After the acquisition, the shops were re-branded as Valvoline Instant Oil Change locations.

One feature of these shops was that they did not have waiting rooms; instead, customers watched the service from their car using a monitor that displayed  live video from cameras placed around the car, and were also given a free newspaper to read (either local or USA Today). Employees were known for their uniforms that feature a bow tie and a newsboy cap. The company motto was "The One You Can Trust".

History

Oil Can Henry's was founded in 1978 by Marshall Stevens, a Tigard, Oregon, real estate developer. In 1988, the Shepanek family and friends purchased the company for $340,000, while Stevens continued to own franchises. Then named OCH International, the company began selling franchises in 1989. Sales at the company grew to $15 million in 1996.

The company was the nation's 18th largest oil change company in 1997. That year Oil Can Henry's signed a deal with Valvoline that included loan guarantees, payments to franchisees to help cover start-up costs, and a discount on oil. By April 2007, the company had grown to 67 locations, with ten of those as company-owned shops. Stevens had to sell 12 of 14 of his locations in 1991 due to financial problems.

Oil Can Henry's and its customers donated a total of $71,000 to the National Military Family Association in late 2014.

Oil Can Henry's and its franchisees donated $91,000 to the National Military Family Association in November, 2015.

OCH International sold to Ashland Inc. on December 11, 2015, which also owns the Valvoline brand.

Operations
The company had locations in six different western states: Washington, Oregon, California, Idaho, Arizona, and Colorado, with the majority of the shops located in Oregon and Washington. Oil Can Henry's also offered a variety of other vehicle maintenance services in addition to oil changes.

See also
Jiffy Lube
Les Schwab Tire Centers

References

External links
 Oil Can Henry's (official site)

Franchises
American companies established in 1972
Retail companies established in 1972
Automotive repair shops of the United States
Companies based in Tualatin, Oregon
Privately held companies based in Oregon
1972 establishments in Oregon